Perng Shaw-jiin (born 28 February 1957) is a Taiwanese lawyer and politician.

Education and early career
Perng majored in law at National Taiwan University, before earning an LL.M from Soochow University and a doctorate of law from the University of Munich. He taught law at Soochow and Ming Chuan University and worked for the Taoyuan Public Prosecutor's Office in the early 1990s.

Political career
Perng was first named to the Legislative Yuan in 1996, and stabbed by gang members his first year in office. He ran for Taoyuan County Magistrate in 2001, losing to Eric Chu. Perng returned to the Legislative Yuan from 2005 to 2008, before stepping down. The election of Chiu Ching-chun as Hsinchu County Magistrate in 2009 triggered a by-election for his legislative seat. Perng ran for the position and won by 15,283 votes. Perng represented Hsinchu County until 2012, when he was succeeded by Hsu Hsin-ying.

References

External links

 

1957 births
Living people
Democratic Progressive Party Members of the Legislative Yuan
Members of the 7th Legislative Yuan
Members of the 3rd Legislative Yuan
Members of the 4th Legislative Yuan
Members of the 6th Legislative Yuan
Hsinchu County Members of the Legislative Yuan
Ludwig Maximilian University of Munich alumni
National Taiwan University alumni
Soochow University (Taiwan) alumni
Taiwanese politicians of Hakka descent
Academic staff of Soochow University (Taiwan)
20th-century Taiwanese lawyers
Taoyuan City Members of the Legislative Yuan